Sonari College, established in 1970, is a general degree college situated at Sonari, in Charaideo district, Assam. This college is affiliated with the Dibrugarh University. This College offers bachelor's degree courses in science and arts.

Departments

Arts 
 Assamese
Economics
Education
 English
History
Political Science

Science 
Botany
Chemistry
Physics
Mathematics
Zoology

References

External links

Universities and colleges in Assam
Colleges affiliated to Dibrugarh University
Educational institutions established in 1970
1970 establishments in Assam